The 2018–19 season was Al-Fayha's  65th year in existence and second season in the Pro League. This season Al-Fayha participated in the Pro League and King Cup.

The season covers the period from 1 July 2018 to 30 June 2019.

Players

Current squad

Out on loan

Transfers

In

Loans in

Out

Loans out

Pre-season friendlies

Competitions

Pro League

League table

Results summary

Results by round

Matches
All times are local, AST (UTC+3).

King Cup

All times are local, AST (UTC+3).

Statistics

Appearances

Last updated on 16 May 2019.

|-
! colspan=14 style=background:#dcdcdc; text-align:center|Goalkeepers

|-
! colspan=14 style=background:#dcdcdc; text-align:center|Defenders

|-
! colspan=14 style=background:#dcdcdc; text-align:center|Midfielders

|-
! colspan=14 style=background:#dcdcdc; text-align:center|Forwards

|-
! colspan=14 style=background:#dcdcdc; text-align:center| Players sent out on loan this season

|-
! colspan=14 style=background:#dcdcdc; text-align:center| Player who made an appearance this season but have left the club

|}

Goalscorers

Last Updated: 16 May 2019

Assists

Last Updated: 16 May 2019

Clean sheets

Last Updated: 11 May 2019

References

Al-Fayha FC seasons
Fayha